The Cannone da 75/27 modello 1912 cannon was a piece of horse artillery used by the Royal Italian Army during the First World War and Second World Wars.  The Germans designated captured guns as the 7.5 cm Feldkanone 245(i).

History 
In 1906 the Royal Italian Army ordered the Cannone da 75/27 modello 06 from Krupp to replace its obsolete Cannone da 75A.  Later in 1912, a new version of the mod 06 modified for use as horse artillery was ordered. These pieces would be used to equip Field Artillery Regiment "a Cavallo" batteries of the Milan Horse Artillery Regiment during the First World War.

In 1939, 51 mod 12s were still in use by the Royal Italian Army and during the Second World War, they armed a group of each of the three rapid artillery regiments of the rapid reaction divisions.  In June 1941 the three groups were consolidated to form the 3rd fast artillery regiment of the 3rd Principe Amedeo Duca d'Aosta division that participated in the Italian expeditionary force during the invasion of the Soviet Union.  In response to the heavy losses experienced by Axis forces on the Eastern Front and North Africa, Italian mobile artillery regiments were reorganized, reequipped, and motorized during 1942 with two groups of Cannone da 75/27 modello 11s and one group of Obice da 100/17s.

Design 
The mod 1912 was a breech-loaded gun with a Horizontal sliding-block breech, a box trail carriage, gun shield, hydro-spring recoil mechanism, and two wooden-spoked steel-rimmed wheels.  The mod 12s carriage was designed to be towed at higher speed than the mod 06.

The barrel and the breech are the same as the mod 06, except the breech incorporates a counterweight to shift the center of gravity of the barrel rearward. The mod 12 uses a one-piece shield instead of a two-piece shield and it lacks the seats on the front of the shield of the mod 06.  The mod 12 used the same fixed quickfire ammunition as the mod 06.

For transport, the mod 12 was attached to a limber that carried 28 rounds of ammunition and was towed by a six-horse team.  Three gunners rode the three horses to the left, while the piece was preceded by the crew chief and followed by four gunners, all on horseback, for a total of 11 animals per gun.

Gallery

Related guns
 Krupp 7.5 cm Model 1903 - Krupp progenitor of the modello 1906 and modello 1912.
 Canon de 75 mle TR - Belgian field gun based on the M1903.
 Canon de 75 mle GP II - Belgian upgrade of the TR.
 Type 38 75 mm field gun - Japanese field gun based on the M1903.
 Siderius 7-veld - Dutch field gun based on the M1903.

References

75 mm artillery
Artillery of Italy
World War I guns
World War I artillery of Italy
World War II artillery of Italy